The Ash Mountain Entrance Sign at Sequoia National Park was constructed in 1935 by Civilian Conservation Corps craftsmen. Featuring a carved Native American face, the sign was made from blocks of sequoia wood and fastened with wrought iron brackets.

The design was first proposed by National Park Service architect Merel S. Sager in 1931, who designed a small log sign for the Ash Mountain entrance. In 1935 resident park landscape architect Harold G. Fowler created a much larger design.  He recruited CCC worker George W. Muno, who had displayed a talent for woodworking, and they selected a piece of fallen sequoia wood from the Giant Forest. Fowler sketched the profile in blue chalk on the wood using an Indian Head nickel as a guide. Muno carved the wood over several months and the sign was assembled and erected over the winter of 1935–36. It was moved in 1964 to make room for a new park entrance station.

The sign is supported by a four-foot-diameter sequoia log rising from a two-tiered masonry platform. The sign panel is ten feet wide by four feet high and one foot thick, carved into a profile reputed to signify Sequoyah, whose Cherokee tribe never inhabited California. The sign was originally unpainted, but assumed its present appearance in the 1950s. As originally built, a matching log pylon stood on the opposite side of the road.  The pylon was removed when the sign was relocated.

See also
 East Entrance Sign (Zion National Park)
 South Entrance Sign (Zion National Park)

References

External links

 Parkitecture in the Western Parks: Gateways National Park Service

National Register of Historic Places in Sequoia National Park
Park buildings and structures on the National Register of Historic Places in California
Individual signs in the United States
History of the Sierra Nevada (United States)
History of the San Joaquin Valley
Buildings and structures completed in 1935
Civilian Conservation Corps in California
National Park Service rustic in Sequoia National Park
1935 establishments in California
Individual signs on the National Register of Historic Places